Alemseged is both a surname and a given name. Notable people with the name include:

Zeresenay Alemseged (born 1969), Ethiopian paleoanthropologist
Alemseged Assefa, Ethiopian banker
Alemseged Efrem (born 1970), Eritrean football coach 

African given names